Jamaica Race Course, also called the Jamaica Racetrack, was an American thoroughbred horse racing facility operated by the Metropolitan Jockey Club in Jamaica, Queens, New York City.

History
The  track opened on April 27, 1903, a day which featured the inaugural running of the Excelsior Handicap. Eugene D. Wood, one of the founders and largest stockholder, served as its first president. Upon Wood's death in April 1924, Dr. Edward P. Kilroe was appointed president to replace him. The Wood Memorial Stakes is named in Eugene Wood's honor.

Legendary Hall of Fame horse trainer Sunny Jim Fitzsimmons was the first to train at Jamaica Race Course and Native Dancer made a winning debut here on April 19, 1952.  The facility's attendance record of 64,679 was set on Memorial Day, 1945.  It was home to ongoing races such as the Prioress Stakes,  Frizette Stakes, Paumonok Handicap, Excelsior Handicap, Wood Memorial Stakes, Remsen Handicap, Bed O' Roses Handicap, and the Jamaica Handicap.

In 1955, the Greater New York Association took over management of Jamaica Race Course along with Aqueduct Racetrack, Belmont Park, and Saratoga Race Course and decided to undertake renovations to Aqueduct in South Ozone Park, the other track in the Greater Jamaica area.  Jamaica took on the Big A dates during Aqueduct's four year renovation, after which it would be sold for redevelopment as a housing project. With Aqueduct slated to reopen in the fall of 1959, Jamaica ceased operations on August 1 and was torn down the following year.  Today the Rochdale Village housing development occupies the former site of Jamaica Race Course.

The racetrack was served by the adjacent Locust Manor station on the Long Island Rail Road.

Gallery

References

 
1903 establishments in New York City
1959 disestablishments in New York (state)
Defunct horse racing venues in New York City
History of Queens, New York
Jamaica, Queens
Sports venues completed in 1903
Sports venues demolished in 1960
Sports venues in Queens, New York